Angal, or Mendi, is an Engan language complex of the Southern Highlands province of Papua New Guinea.

Mendi has a pandanus language used during karuka harvest.

References

Engan languages
Languages of Southern Highlands Province
Pandanus avoidance registers